USS New Orleans may refer to:

, was a ship-of-the-line laid down in January 1815 but her construction was halted and she remained on the stocks, housed over, until sold in September 1883
, was a New Orleans-class (1896) protected cruiser commissioned in 1898, decommissioned in 1922, and served during both the Spanish–American War and World War I
, was a New Orleans-class (1931) heavy cruiser commissioned in 1934, decommissioned in 1947, and saw much service in World War II
, was an Iwo Jima-class amphibious assault ship commissioned in 1968, decommissioned in 1997, and sunk as a target in 2010.  She was a recovery ship for Project Apollo and was used in the filming of the movie Apollo 13
, is a San Antonio-class amphibious transport dock commissioned in 2007 and currently in active service

See also
  was a floating gun battery on the Mississippi River in the service of the Confederate States of America.

New Orleans, USS